The Crow Creek-Cole Ranch Headquarters Historic District, in Laramie County, Wyoming near Cheyenne, dates from 1879.  It was listed on the National Register of Historic Places in 2009 as Crow Creek-Cole Ranch Headquarters Historic District

It has also been known as Cole Creek Ranch, as Gilchrist Ranch, and as Cole Ranch.

The ranch was "an active cattle-grazing operation from 1879 to 1972."

The Crow Creek/Cole Ranch Headquarters site was funded by a $39,990 Historic Preservation Tax Credit in a project completed in 2011.

References

	
Ranches on the National Register of Historic Places in Wyoming
Buildings and structures completed in 1879
Laramie County, Wyoming
Historic districts on the National Register of Historic Places in Wyoming